Bobby Babich is an American football coach and former player who is the linebackers coach for the Buffalo Bills of the National Football League (NFL). He played college football as a cornerback at North Dakota State University in the early 2000s.

Playing career
Bobby committed to play cornerback for his father at North Dakota State. He played there for four years and was a twice named an academic all-conference honoree.

Coaching career

Kent State
Bobby began his coaching career in 2006 at Kent State while serving as a graduate assistant.

Eastern Illinois
Between 2007 and 2010 Bobby worked at Eastern Illinois as the team's secondary coach.

Carolina Panthers
In 2011 Bobby made the jump to the NFL with the Carolina Panthers serving as an administrative assistant to the coaching staff. In 2012 he was promoted to a defensive assistant coach.

Cleveland Browns
In 2013 Bobby joined the Cleveland Browns where he worked as an assistant with their secondary until the end of the 2015 season.

FIU
In 2016 became FIU's secondary coach and defensive pass game coordinator after originally taking the defensive coordinator job for the Edinboro Fighting Scots.

Buffalo Bills
In 2017 Bobby joined his father on the Bills coaching staff under Sean McDermott as the team's assistant defensive backs coach. In 2018 he was promoted to the team's safeties coach. In 2022, he was promoted to linebackers coach after his father retired.

Personal life
Bobby is the son of Bob and Nancy Babich. Bob is the former head coach of the North Dakota State Bison and coached alongside Bobby in Buffalo.

References

North Dakota State Bison football players
Kent State Golden Flashes football coaches
Eastern Illinois Panthers football players
Carolina Panthers coaches
Cleveland Browns coaches
FIU Panthers football coaches
Buffalo Bills coaches

Living people

Year of birth missing (living people)